The Embassy of Nigeria, Doha is a Nigerian diplomatic mission in Qatar established in 2013 and currently headed by ambassador Yakubu Abdullahi Ahmed. The mission is the only representation of Nigeria in the State of Qatar.

Brief History 
The embassy of Nigeria in Qatar was created in 2013 to foster good bilateral relationship between the two countries. It was the same year that the state of Qatar also opened an embassy in Nigeria. The embassy provides various services which include passport services (including Tourist, Business, Temporary permit, Diplomatic/Official and Transit Visa), travel visas and attestation and legalisation of documents of individuals and companies.

Embassy officials 
 Mr Yakubu Abdullahi Ahmed  (Ambassador)
 Mr. Musa Abubakar (Minister/Head Consular and Immigration Matters)
 Mr. Rabiu Sulaiman (Senior Counsellor/Head Economic, Trade and Investment Matters)
 Mr. Kimiebi Imomotimi Ebienfa (Head of Chancery)
 Mr. Molanrewaju AbdulRazaq Shonubi  (Head of Political Matters)
 Mr. Usman Inuwa (Finance Attache’)
 Mr. Ejeh Peter Ogoh (Administrative Attache’)

Challenges 
In February 2022, the International Center for Investigative Reporting (ICIR) reported that "Nigerians residing in Qatar have continued to face difficulty acquiring a Nigerian passport as the embassy in Doha does not have the machines to process the travel document, but relies on the passport intervention team in the United Arab Emirates". The situation resulted in backlog of applications submitted and many Nigerian expatriates risk losing their jobs, blocking of bank accounts and even deportation.

References 

Doha
Nigeria
Nigeria–Qatar relations